Saman Fonseka (born 8 July 1969) is a Sri Lankan former cricketer. He played in 91 first-class and 13 List A matches between 1988/89 and 2001/02. After his playing career he became a cricket coach, becoming the head coach of a Sri Lankan expatriate team in Qatar.

References

External links
 

1969 births
Living people
Sri Lankan cricketers
Galle Cricket Club cricketers
Kalutara Town Club cricketers
Place of birth missing (living people)